The year 2002 is the first year in the history of Cage Warriors, a mixed martial arts promotion based in the United Kingdom. In 2002 Cage Rage Championships held 3 events beginning with, Cage Warriors: Armageddon.

Events list

CWFC 1: Armageddon

CWFC 1: Armageddon was an event held on July 27, 2002 in London, England.

Results

CWFC 2: Fists of Fury

CWFC 2: Fists of Fury was an event held on November 30, 2002 in London, England.

Results

CWFC: Gangwarily

CWFC: Gangwarily was an event held on December 8, 2002 in Southampton, England.

Results

See also 
 Cage Warriors

References

Cage Warriors events
2002 in mixed martial arts